The United States House of Representatives elections in California, 1892 was an election for California's delegation to the United States House of Representatives, which occurred as part of the general election of the House of Representatives on November 8, 1892. California gained one seat as a result of the 1890 Census, which was won by the Populist Party. Democrats also picked up an open Republican seat.

Overview

Delegation Composition

Results

District 1

District 2

District 3

District 4

District 5

District 6

District 7

See also
53rd United States Congress
Political party strength in California
Political party strength in U.S. states
United States House of Representatives elections, 1892

References
California Elections Page
Office of the Clerk of the House of Representatives

External links
California Legislative District Maps (1911-Present)
RAND California Election Returns: District Definitions

1892
California
California United States House of Representatives